Brestak (in Bulgarian: Брестак) is a village in northern Bulgaria, Valchi Dol Municipality, Varna Province. Before 1934 its name was Karaagach (in Bulgarian: Караагач). In 1961 its population was 2,476, and in 1989 - 1,844.

References

Villages in Varna Province